The 1999–2000 St. Louis Blues season was the 33rd season for the National Hockey League (NHL) franchise that was established on June 5, 1967.

The Blues qualified for the Stanley Cup playoffs for the 21st consecutive season after finishing the regular season with a record of 51–19–11–1 (114 points), sufficient to win the Central Division title as well as the Presidents' Trophy for the highest points total in the NHL. It was the Blues' first division title since the 1986–87 season, when they won the Norris Division, and their last until the 2011–12 season.

Off-season

Regular season
The Blues allowed the fewest goals during the regular season with 165, and had the most shutouts with nine. They also tied the Washington Capitals for the fewest short-handed goals allowed with just three.

Season standings

Schedule and results

Playoffs
 The #1 seed Blues were defeated in seven games by the #8 seed San Jose Sharks in the first round.

Player statistics

Regular season
Scoring

Goaltending

Playoffs
Scoring

Goaltending

Awards and records
 Presidents' Trophy for best regular season record in the NHL
 Hart Memorial Trophy - Chris Pronger
 James Norris Memorial Trophy - Chris Pronger
 NHL Plus-Minus Award - Chris Pronger
 First All-Star Team - Chris Pronger
 Jack Adams Award - Joel Quenneville
 Lady Byng Memorial Trophy - Pavol Demitra
 William M. Jennings Trophy - Roman Turek
 Second All-Star Team - Roman Turek

Transactions

Draft picks
St. Louis's draft picks at the 1999 NHL Entry Draft held at the FleetCenter in Boston, Massachusetts.

References
 Blues on Hockey Database

St. Louis
St. Louis
St. Louis Blues seasons
Presidents' Trophy seasons
St
St